Castle of Magical Dreams is the centerpiece castle at Hong Kong Disneyland. It replaced the park’s previous centerpiece, Sleeping Beauty Castle, as part of the park's 15th anniversary celebration. The castle’s design pays tribute to the 12 Disney Princesses and 2 Frozen queens, including Snow White, Cinderella, Aurora, Ariel, Belle, Jasmine, Pocahontas, Mulan, Tiana, Rapunzel, Merida, Moana, Anna and Elsa. It is the third attraction to open as part of the park's multi-year expansion from 2018 to 2023.

The castle features a jewelry shop — Enchanted Treasures and a meet-and-greet attraction — The Royal Reception Hall. The castle forecourt features a show stage and viewing area for the new daytime and nighttime spectacular, Follow Your Dreams and Momentous. The castle area consists of the castle itself, the Bibbidi Bobbidi Boutique in Storybook Shoppe and the Snow White Grotto.

History
On 22 November 2016, the Walt Disney Company and the Hong Kong Government announced plans for a multi-year, HK$10.9 billion expansion of Hong Kong Disneyland. The proposed expansion includes a re-imagined castle, Arendelle: World of Frozen, Stark Expo, multiple new attractions and live entertainment.

Hong Kong Disneyland Resort and Walt Disney Imagineering Asia revealed creative design concepts and details of the upcoming castle transformation on  8 December 2017. The construction began after the last show of Disney in the Stars fireworks spectacular on 1 January 2018. The construction also took place in park operating hours and guests were invited to be part of the transformation in a campaign called "#CreateADisneyCastle". Throughout the transformation, the Central Plaza displayed the scenes of 13 Disney princess stories with lyrics of the stories’ classic songs. On 1 July 2019, another Bibbidi Bobbidi Boutique in the resort opened in Storybook Shoppe as part of the new castle project. The name of the newly imagined castle was unveiled in D23 Expo 2019, the Castle of Magical Dreams.

Although the castle was slated to officially open in late 2020, park guests were able begin experiencing previews of the castle through special hotel and ticket packages starting on 25 September 2020, after the second closure of the park due to COVID-19 pandemic. On 20 November 2020, former managing director of Hong Kong Disneyland Resort Stephanie Young officially announced the opening of Castle of Magical Dreams in a celebration moment with Disney Princesses and heroines and representatives of local non-profit organizations. As part of the park's 15th anniversary celebration, the opening of Castle of Magical Dreams came along with a behind-the-scenes exhibition and an audio tour in introducing the creative process from conceptual sketches, innovative building techniques to story integration.

See also
 Sleeping Beauty Castle
 Cinderella Castle
 Le Château de la Belle au Bois Dormant
 Enchanted Storybook Castle

References

External links
 Hong Kong Disneyland site

Amusement rides introduced in 2020
Hong Kong Disneyland
Fantasyland
Disney Princess
Frozen (franchise)
Walt Disney Parks and Resorts icons
2020 establishments in Hong Kong